William Charles Harris (31 October 1928 – December 1989) was a Welsh footballer, who played for his national side and Middlesbrough and later became a manager.

Career
Bill Harris started his footballing career with local club Swansea City but failed to graduate beyond the third team and so moved to Llanelli in 1949. After just six months at the club he signed for Hull City for £2,000. He played 131 games for Hull before a move to Middlesbrough in March 1954 for £15,000. Harris, a wing half, played 378 games, scoring 72 goals for Middlesbrough and was capped for Wales. He won his first Welsh cap against Austria in May 1954 in Vienna but had to wait three years for his second cap. Harris had the distinction of scoring a goal in just 11 seconds in a 5-1 FA cup win against Shrewsbury Town in 1962.

In March 1965, he joined Bradford City as their third player-manager following the departure of Bob Brocklebank. He took charge at a struggling club, during its darkest days, and in his first season, the club had finished 19th in Division Four. The following season the club's problems continued and Harris resigned a year after he took over with the club heading towards re-election.

His stay also signalled the end of his playing career, when he was injured during a 7–1 defeat to Crewe Alexandra and was advised to stop playing.

In November 1967, he returned to Teesside as manager-coach of non-league Stockton, before he retired in May 1969. He later worked for an insurance firm in Middlesbrough. He died  in Middlesbrough in 1989  after suffering several strokes.

External links

1928 births
1989 deaths
Footballers from Swansea
Welsh footballers
Wales international footballers
English Football League players
Swansea City A.F.C. players
Hull City A.F.C. players
Middlesbrough F.C. players
Bradford City A.F.C. players
Bradford City A.F.C. managers
Association football wing halves
Welsh football managers